"Early Bird" is a science fiction short story written in 1973 by Theodore R. Cogswell and Theodore L. Thomas. The  story was first published in Astounding: The John W Campbell Memorial Anthology. It takes place within the same universe as Cogswell's 1952 novel The Spectre General and features the character Major Kurt Dixon of the Imperial Space Marines.

Synopsis

After the Marines have defeated the Galactic Protectorate, the Empire's trade routes start being invaded by the Kierans. The Kierans are an alien race that use ships equipped with a seemingly invincible weapon that clouds the brains of the crew of the ships that try to follow them. Major Kurt Dixon is given command of a scout patrol that follows a Kieran ship to its home base, but he is "fogged" and left unconscious.

Dixon's ship is equipped with an experimental computer that generates a cybernetic personality to support him on long lonely space patrols. The computer, known as Zelda, manages to land the ship on an uncharted planet, inhabited by huge organo-metallic creatures that prey on each other with awesome weaponry and computerised defences.

Whilst the ship is disabled on the planet, it becomes a part of a mating process between two of these creatures. The 'sperm' of one creature homes in on the 'egg' laid by another creature. As part of a 'selection of the fittest' process, Dixon and his ship are modified, acquiring vastly improved mental and physical powers. Dixon discovers that he can now out-manoeuvre the Kierans. He realises that the entire patrol fleet can do the same thing; the newly improved fleet then proceeds to defeat the Kierans.

External links 

1973 short stories
American short stories
Science fiction short stories